Telemark cattle or Telemark cow is an old Norwegian breed of cow.

Characteristics
Telemark cattle are red, with a white colour on the back in the shape of a cross. Sometimes, cows are also white on the underside. The face is usually mixed in colour. Most Telemark colour have horns. The Telemark is primarily a milking breed, and does not grow very large.

History
Telemark cattle were defined as a breed in 1865. The driving force behind the work was the state agronomist Johan Lindeqvist, originally from Sweden. After the war, Norwegian red cattle were introduced into Norway. Traditional cow breeds then suffered a major drop off in numbers. In the 1980s, there were steps put into place to protect rare breeds. In 2006, there were 400 animals of this breed in Norway.

See also
Norwegian Red
Dølafe
Målselvfe
Sidet trønder- og nordlandsfe
Østlandsk rødkolle
Vestlandsk fjordfe
Vestlandsk raudkolle

References

Further reading
Jan Erik Kjær. Bondens lykke, kongens gull.

External links
About the race at NordGen
N-EURO-CAD Overview of Nordic breeds
Telemark cattle with pictures 

Cattle breeds originating in Norway
Cattle breeds